Bing Liu (born 1989) is a Chinese-American director and cinematographer. He is best known for directing the documentary Minding the Gap, which was nominated for Best Documentary Feature at the 91st Academy Awards.

Early life and education
Liu was born in China. His family moved to the United States when he was five and soon after his parents got divorced. Liu obtained American citizenship when he was 14 years old after his mother moved him to Rockford, Illinois and remarried. She had one son with his stepfather, a white American man. His stepfather was physically and mentally abusive, once shooting a gun at his mother. He referred to Liu and his brother and mother using racial slurs and subjected them to various types of abuse. Liu stated that he is no longer fluent in Mandarin as he once was because his stepfather did not let him and his mother communicate with each other using the language.

He was first inspired by film-making after seeing First Love when he was 15, a video produced by Transworld Skateboarding Magazine that was mostly shot on 16 mm film. From then, he began interviewing skateboarders and learning about photography.

He attended community college at Rock Valley College. Liu left Rockford when he was 19 and then attended University of Illinois at Chicago where he majored in literature.

Career
From 2012, he worked on various film sets, typically doing camera work. Liu's first job on a major film was as a crew member for At Any Price.

His 2018 documentary film Minding the Gap was developed with Kartemquin Films. The film centered on himself and two other young men who were skateboarders in their hometown of Rockford, Illinois. The footage was shot over 12 years, beginning when Liu was 14, though it was only in his early 20s that he decided to make the documentary. Liu is both a director and the subject of the film as he often speaks to his subjects from off camera. The film deals heavily with domestic violence and toxic masculinity. It is the first feature film that he directed.

In 2020, Liu was named a United States Artists (USA) fellow.

His second documentary feature, All These Sons, which focuses on gun violence in Chicago as it follows two Chicago-area programs targeting at-risk young men, was co-directed with Joshua Altman and premiered at the 2021 Tribeca Film Festival, where Liu and Altman won the jury award for Best Cinematography, Documentary Feature.

Liu worked as a segment director for America to Me, a documentary series released by Starz in 2018. He has a forthcoming documentary project on millennial relationships.

On A24's podcast, Ocean Vuong revealed Liu would be adapting Vuong's novel On Earth We're Briefly Gorgeous into a feature film with A24.

References

External links 

Bing Liu on Vimeo

1989 births
Living people
Chinese emigrants to the United States
People from Rockford, Illinois
American film directors of Chinese descent
American documentary film directors